Vitali Bandarenka (born 2 October 1985) is a Belarusian boxer. He competed in the men's middleweight event at the 2020 Summer Olympics.

References

External links
 

1985 births
Living people
Belarusian male boxers
Olympic boxers of Belarus
Boxers at the 2020 Summer Olympics
People from Gomel District
Sportspeople from Gomel Region
21st-century Belarusian people